Wolfman is a text adventure video game released by CRL in 1988 for the Commodore 64, Amstrad CPC, and ZX Spectrum home computers.

Plot 
After a heavy sleep the protagonist awakes to find his clothes ripped and bloody, yet no sign of injury to himself. Glancing through a window, he sees the body of a dead girl lying nearby, her throat has been torn out. He then realizes that he is in reality a werewolf, and must escape violent retribution by enraged villagers and somehow find a cure for his illness. After falling in love with a young woman named Nadia, the protagonist must rescue her when she is kidnapped while continuing to seek a cure for his lycanthropy.

Gameplay 
The game is a standard text adventure with graphics in some locations to set the scene. It is in three parts, with the player in the role of the Wolfman in the first and third, and of his fiancée in the second.

Development 
The game was produced using the Gilsoft Professional Adventure Writer.

Reception 
As with the earlier CRL adventures Dracula, Frankenstein, and Jack the Ripper, the game was classified by the British Board of Film Censors, receiving an '18' certificate for its gory graphics.

References

External links 

Wolfman at Lemon 64

1980s interactive fiction
1988 video games
Adventure games
Amstrad CPC games
Commodore 64 games
CRL Group games
Single-player video games
Video games developed in the United Kingdom
Werewolf video games
ZX Spectrum games